József Faddi (1920 – August 4, 1992) was a Hungarian agronomist and politician, member of the National Assembly (MP) for Kunszentmiklós (Bács-Kiskun County Constituency IV) between 1990 and 1992.

Biography
He was born into a farmer family. He joined the Independent Smallholders, Agrarian Workers and Civic Party (FKGP) and the Hungarian Peasant Alliance in 1945. He participated in the reorganization of the FKGP during the Hungarian Revolution of 1956.

Faddi secured a mandate in the first democratic parliamentary election in 1990. He was a member of the Committee on Budget, Tax and Finance since June 12, 1990. He died on August 4, 1992. He was replaced by Tamás Gábor Nagy on May 3, 1993 after winning the by-election in Kunszentmiklós and its area.

References

1920 births
1992 deaths
Hungarian agronomists
Independent Smallholders, Agrarian Workers and Civic Party politicians
Members of the National Assembly of Hungary (1990–1994)
20th-century agronomists